Del Rosario is a surname. It may also refer to:

 Del Rosario River, river in Mexico
 Rosario Islands (Islas del Rosario), an archipelago in Colombia
 Sierra del Rosario, a mountain range in Cuba
 Del Rosario University, university in Bogotá, Colombia